Pass Creek Bridge is a covered bridge in the city of Drain in Douglas County in the U.S. state of Oregon. It originally carried stagecoaches over Pass Creek before being moved a few hundred feet from its original location in 1987 and reassembled behind the Drain Civic Center. From then through 2014, when the city closed the deteriorating bridge completely, it carried pedestrian traffic. Pass Creek is a tributary of Elk Creek in the Umpqua River basin.

Although the official date of construction of the bridge is 1925, members of the Umpqua Historic Preservation Society say the bridge was built in 1906, according to Oregon Department of Transportation. In either case, an even earlier bridge carried a covered wagon route over the creek at this same location. The route, an 1876 extension of the Overland Stagecoach, opened between Roseburg in the interior and Scottsburg near the Oregon Coast. Records from 1895 show a covered railroad bridge next to the covered stagecoach bridge. The rail bridge then carried the Oregon and California Railroad, later acquired by the Southern Pacific.

The 1925 bridge carried First Street over the creek downstream of its 21st-century location behind the civic center. By then, the railroad bridge next to it was a steel truss structure built in 1906. The 1925 Howe truss bridge had few notable architectural details and no windows, although it had cedar siding and some hand-hewn timbers likely recycled from an earlier bridge.

See also
 List of Oregon covered bridges

References

Bridges completed in 1925
Covered bridges in Oregon
Pedestrian bridges in Oregon
Road bridges in Oregon
Bridges in Douglas County, Oregon
Wooden bridges in Oregon
Tourist attractions in Douglas County, Oregon